The Similou were an electronic music duo from Gothenburg, Sweden, comprising Dizzy Crane (Joel Eriksson) and Jesse Nectar (Erik Niklasson).

Discography

Albums

Singles

Internet meme
"All This Love" is the base of an Internet meme, particularly on the website YTMND. On July 16, 2006, YTMND user Salta created a site called "Rainbow Stalin;" which comes from a misinterpretation of the words "rainbow stylin'" in The Similou's song to be about Joseph Stalin. This site featured an edited Soviet propaganda picture to which Salta added a rainbow and gave Stalin cartoon-like eyes. Many of the sites have Soviet propaganda art edited with flashing colors and accessories such as sunglasses, headphones, and turntables to portray Stalin as a jubilant DJ. While the meme comes from YTMND, references can be found on other websites such as YouTube.

References

External links
Artist page on DNM

Swedish dance music groups
Internet memes
English-language singers from Sweden